The list of awards and nominations received by the rock band Evanescence consists of 23 awards won and 64 nominations from various organizations and publications. Evanescence was founded in 1995 by singer, pianist and songwriter Amy Lee and former guitarist and songwriter Ben Moody. After recording and releasing three EPs and one demo album, they released their debut studio album Fallen in 2003.

After the success Fallen and their first single "Bring Me to Life", Evanescence won two Grammy Awards awards out of five nominations in 2004. The following year, the single "My Immortal" was nominated in the category of Best Pop Performance by a Duo or Group with Vocals. In 2008, The Open Doors "Sweet Sacrifice" received a nomination for Best Hard Rock Performance. Among other accolades, the band has also won three Loudwire Music Awards, a Kerrang! Award, a Revolver Golden Gods Award, and received a Brit Award nomination, three American Music Award nominations, and five MTV Video Music Award nominations.

American Music Awards
The American Music Awards is an annual awards ceremony created by Dick Clark in 1973. Evanescence received one nomination in 2003 and two in 2004.

|-
|rowspan="1"|2003
|Fallen
|Favorite Pop/Rock Album
|
|-
|rowspan="2"|2004
|rowspan="2"|Evanescence
|Favorite Pop/Rock Band/Duo/Group
|
|-
|Artist of the Year
|
|}

Billboard Music Awards
The Billboard Music Awards is an honor given by Billboard, a publication and music popularity chart covering the music business. Evanescence was nominated in three categories for the 2003 event.

|-
|rowspan="3"|2003
|Evanescence
|New Group Artist of the Year
|
|-
|"Bring Me to Life"
|Soundtrack Single of the Year
|
|-
|"Bring Me to Life"
|Mainstream Top 40 Single of the Year
|
|}

Brit Awards
The BRIT Awards are the British Phonographic Industry's annual pop music awards. Evanescence were nominated in one category on the ceremony.

|-
|2004
|Evanescence
|International Breakthrough Artist
|
|-
|}

Danish Music Awards
The Danish Music Awards are the most important music awards of Denmark. Evanescence has won once.

|-
|2004
|Evanescence
|Foreign Newcomer of the Year
|
|-
|}

Echo Awards
Echo Awards is a German music award granted every year by the Deutsche Phono-Akademie (an association of recording companies). Each year's winner is determined by the previous year's sales.

|-
|rowspan="3"| 2004
|rowspan="3"| Evanescence
|International Group Of The Year
|
|-
|International Rock/alternative
|
|-
|International Newcomer Of The Year
|
|}

Grammy Awards
The Grammy Awards are awarded annually by the National Academy of Recording Arts and Sciences. The first Grammy Awards ceremony was held on May 4, 1959, to honor musical accomplishments by performers for the year 1958. Evanescence won two awards out of seven nominations.

|-
|rowspan="5"|2004
|Evanescence
|Best New Artist
|
|-
|rowspan="2"|Fallen
|Album of the Year
|
|-
|Best Rock Album
|
|-
|rowspan="2"|"Bring Me to Life"
|Best Hard Rock Performance
|
|-
|Best Rock Song
|
|-
|rowspan="1"|2005
|"My Immortal"
|Best Pop Performance by a Duo or Group with Vocals
|
|-
|rowspan="1"|2008
|"Sweet Sacrifice"
|Best Hard Rock Performance
|
|-
|}

International Dance Music Awards

|-
|rowspan="1"|2004
|"Bring Me to Life"
|Best Alternative Rock Dance
|
|-
|}

Kerrang! Awards
The Kerrang! Awards is an annual music awards show in the United Kingdom, founded by the music magazine, Kerrang!. The awards feature a mixture of readers' and critics' awards. The annual Kerrang! Awards ceremony is usually held in mid-August in London. The annual awards ceremony features performances by prominent artists, and some of the awards of more popular interest are presented in a televised ceremony.

|-
|rowspan="2"|2003
|Evanescence
|Best International Newcomer
|
|-
|"Bring Me to Life"
|Best Single
|
|-
|rowspan="1"|2004
|"Going Under"
|Best Single
|
|-
|rowspan="2"|2012
|Evanescence
|Best International Band
|
|-
|Amy Lee
|Hottest Female
|
|}

Loudwire Music Awards

|-
|rowspan="5"|2011
|"What You Want"
|Rock Song of the Year
|
|-
|rowspan="2"|Evanescence
|Comeback of the Year
|
|-
|Artist of the Year
|
|-
|Evanescence
|Rock Album of the Year
|
|-
|Amy Lee
|Rock Goddess of the Year
|
|-
|rowspan="1"|2012
|Amy Lee
|Rock Goddess of the Year
|
|-
|}

MTV Awards

MTV Video Music Awards
The MTV Video Music Awards were established in 1984 by MTV to celebrate the top music videos of the year. Evanescence received 5 nominations.

|-
|rowspan="2"|2003
|rowspan="2"|"Bring Me to Life"
|Best New Artist in a Video
|
|-
|Best Rock Video
|
|-
|rowspan="1"|2004
|"My Immortal"
|Best Rock Video
|
|-
|rowspan="1"|2020
|"Wasted on You"
|Best Rock
|
|-
|rowspan="1"|2021
|"Use My Voice"
|Best Rock
|
|-
|}

MTV Europe Music Awards

|-
|rowspan="3"|2003
|"Bring Me to Life"
|Best Song
|
|-
|rowspan="2"|Evanescence
|Best Group
|
|-
|Best New Act
|
|-
|rowspan="1"|2006
|Evanescence
|Best Rock
|
|-
|rowspan="1"|2007
|Evanescence
|Rock Out
|
|-
|rowspan="1"|2012
|Evanescence
|Best World Stage Performance
|
|-
|}

Los Premios MTV Latinoamérica

|-
|rowspan="2"|2003
|rowspan="2"|Evanescence
|Best New Artist – International
|
|-
|Best Rock Artist – International
|
|-
|rowspan="1"|2004
|Evanescence
|Best Rock Artist – International
|
|-
|rowspan="1"|2007
|Evanescence
|Best Rock Artist – International
|
|-
|}

MTV Australia Awards
MTV Australia Awards (previously known as the MTV Australia Video Music Awards or AVMA's) started in 2005 and is Australia's first awards show to celebrate both local and international acts. Evanescence won one award on the ceremony.

|-
|rowspan="1"|2007
|The Open Door
|Album Of The Year
|
|-
|}

MTV Asia Awards

|-
|rowspan="2"|2004
|rowspan="2"|Evanescence
|Favorite Breakthrough Artist
|
|-
|Favourite Rock Act
|
|-
|}

MuchMusic Video Awards
The MuchMusic Video Awards is an annual awards ceremony presented by the Canadian music video channel MuchMusic.

|-
|rowspan="2"|2007
|Evanescence
|People's Choice: Favorite International Group
|
|-
|"Call Me When You're Sober"
|Best International Video – Group
|
|-
|}

NME Awards
The NME Awards are an annual music awards show founded by the music magazine NME. Evanescence has received one award in 2013.

|-
|rowspan="1"|2013
|Amy Lee
|Hottest Woman
|
|-
|}

NRJ Music Awards

|-
|rowspan="1"|2004
|Evanescence
|Best International New Artist
|
|-
|rowspan="3"|2007
|rowspan="1"|Evanescence
|Best International Group/Duo of the Year
|
|-
|The Open Door
|Best International Album of the Year
|
|-
|"Call Me When You're Sober"
|Music Video of the Year
|
|-
|}

Planeta Awards
The Planeta Awards is an annual Peruvian awards ceremony established by Radio Planeta. Evanescence has received one award from two nominations.

|-
|rowspan="2"| 2007 || Evanescence  || Rock Artist of the Year || 
|-
| "Sweet Sacrifice" || Best Female Vocal Interpretation (Amy Lee) || 
|-

Revolver Golden Gods Awards
The Revolver Golden Gods Awards is an annual awards ceremony held by Revolver, an American hard rock and heavy metal magazine.

|-
|rowspan="4"|2012
|Amy Lee
|Best Vocalist
|
|-
|Evanescence
|Album of the Year
|
|-
|rowspan="2"|Evanescence
|Comeback of the Year
|
|-
|Most Dedicated Fans
|
|-
|}

Teen Choice Awards
The Teen Choice Awards is an awards show presented annually by the Fox Broadcasting Company.

|-
|rowspan="1"|2003
|"Bring Me to Life"
|Choice Music Rock Track
|
|-
|rowspan="1"|2004
|Evanescence
|Choice Rock Group
|
|-
|}

World Music Awards
The annual World Music Awards, founded in 1989, is an international awards show that honors recording artists based on their worldwide sales figures, which are provided by the International Federation of the Phonographic Industry. On the ceremony Evanescence won one award.

|-
|rowspan="1"|2004
|Evanescence
|Best Rock Artist
|
|-
|}

References

External links

Awards
Lists of awards received by American musician
Lists of awards received by musical group